The International Journal of Zoology is a peer-reviewed open access scientific journal covering all areas of zoology. It was established in 2009.

Abstracting and indexing
The journal is abstracted and indexed in AGRICOLA, CAB Abstracts, Chemical Abstracts Service, ProQuest databases, Scopus, and The Zoological Record.

References

External links

Zoology journals
Publications established in 2009
English-language journals
Hindawi Publishing Corporation academic journals